Galeusca–Peoples of Europe (GalEusCa) was a Spanish electoral list in the European Parliament election in 2004 made up from peripheral nationalism parties mainly from Galicia, the Basque Country and Catalonia, the coalition's name being a composite acronym of the three regions' names (Galicia, Euskadi and Catalonia).

Composition

Electoral performance

European Parliament

Defunct political party alliances in Spain
Galician Nationalist Bloc
Regionalist parties in Spain